Institute of Science Nagpur (IoS), alternatively as Government Science Institute, is a government-aided autonomous college located in Nagpur, Maharashtra, India. Established in 1906 during British Raj as the Victoria College of Science, it is affiliated to Rashtrasant Tukadoji Maharaj Nagpur University.

Departments

Physics
Chemistry
Mathematics
Statistics
Electronics
Botany
Zoology
Computer Science
Environmental Science

Accreditation
The college is  recognized by the University Grants Commission (UGC).

References

External links

Colleges affiliated to Rashtrasant Tukadoji Maharaj Nagpur University
Educational institutions established in 1906
1906 establishments in India
Universities and colleges in Maharashtra
Universities and colleges in Nagpur
Science and technology in Nagpur